Intelligence source and information reliability rating systems are used in intelligence analysis. This rating is used for information collected by a human intelligence collector. This type of information collection and job duty exists within many government agencies around the world.

According to Ewen Montagu, John Godfrey devised this system when he was director of the Naval Intelligence Division (N.I.D.) around the time of World War II. 

The system employed by the United States Armed Forces rates the reliability of the source as well as the information. The source reliability is rated between A (history of complete reliability) to E (history of invalid information), with F for source without sufficient history to establish reliability level. The information content is rated between 1 (confirmed) to 5 (improbable), with 6 for information whose reliability can not be evaluated.

For example, a confirmed information from a reliable source has rating A1, an unknown-validity information from a new source without reputation is rated F6, an inconsistent illogical information from a known liar is E5, a confirmed information from a moderately doubtful source is C1.

The evaluation matrix as described in the Field Manual FM 2-22.3 (see also Admiralty code):

Source reliability

Information credibility

References

Intelligence analysis